The identric mean of two positive real numbers x, y is defined as: 

It can be derived from the mean value theorem by considering the secant of the graph of the function . It can be generalized to more variables according by the mean value theorem for divided differences. The identric mean is a special case of the Stolarsky mean.

See also
 Mean
 Logarithmic mean

References

Means